Chimaericola  is a genus of parasitic flatworms in the family Chimaericolidae. The genus was created by August Brinkmann in 1942. Species are parasitic on the gills of Chimaeras.

Species
According to the World Register of Marine Species, only three species are known in this genus:
 Chimaericola colliei Beverley-Burton, Chisholm & Last, 1991 
 Chimaericola leptogaster (Leuckart, 1830) 
 Chimaericola ogilbyi Beverley-Burton, Chisholm & Last, 1991

References

Monogenea genera